Clathrina sceptrum is a species of calcareous sponge from Canada.

References
World Register of Marine Species entry

Clathrina
Sponges described in 1872
Fauna of Canada
Taxa named by Ernst Haeckel
Fauna without expected TNC conservation status